Ait Attab (also known as Aït Attab) is a large agricultural river valley on the northern edge of Azilal province in Morocco.  Its population is divided into a multitude of hamlets called douwars, the largest one being Al Garage, which is also referred to as Ait Attab Center, or more simply as Ait Attab.

Geography
The geography of Ait Attab valley is dominated by the flow of the river Oued el Abid.

History
Ait Attab valley is locally well known for its influence prior to, and resistance against French colonization. It is rumored in Azilal Province that the dam upstream at Bin el Ouidane was built by the French as a means of countering the valley's influence by controlling its water supply.

Present day
Today, Ait Attab is regionally known for the quality of its olive oil and almond harvest. It is also a common stopping point for tourists on their way to the waterfalls at Ouzoud. Nearly all Attabis speak the Moroccan dialect of Arabic. Furthermore, because of the area's Berber heritage, many Attabis speak the valley's dialect of Tamazight, similar to the kind spoken downstream at Bzou.

Geography of Béni Mellal-Khénifra
Valleys of Morocco